Udruženje javnih radija i televizija (UJRT; Serbian Cyrillic: Удружење јавних радија и телевизија) was the union of public broadcasters of Serbia and Montenegro. It served as a full member of the European Broadcasting Union (EBU) from 2001 until its dissolution in 2006.

Members
Radio Television of Serbia
Radio and Television of Montenegro

External links
http://www.rts.rs
http://www.rtcg.me

Defunct television networks
Television channels and stations established in 2001
Television channels and stations disestablished in 2006
2001 establishments in Yugoslavia
2006 disestablishments in Serbia and Montenegro
Defunct mass media in Serbia
Defunct mass media in Montenegro